is a passenger railway station located in the city of Matsuyama, Ehime Prefecture, Japan. It is operated by the private transportation company Iyotetsu.

Lines
During most of the day, railway trains arrive every fifteen minutes. Trains continue from Matsuyama City Station on the Yokogawara Line to Yokogawara Station.

Layout
Kinuyama Station is a staffed station with a single island platform and two tracks. Since the ticket gate is on an extension of the platform, it is necessary to cross the railroad crossing when exiting the ticket gate. The platform has an effective length for three 18-meter-class carriages. There is no waiting room like you see in other stations. In case of an emergency such as an accident resulting in injury or death or signal trouble, the Takahama Line will return to Furumachi Station or Mitsu Station. The section between Furumachi and this station is elevated, and there are no railroad crossings.

History
Kinuyama Station was opened on 1 November 1927. On 21 August 1995 the station was moved 100 meters in the direction of Takahama.

Surrounding area
Fuji Retailing's shopping center PARTY FUJI Kinuyama

See also
 List of railway stations in Japan

References

External links

 Iyotetsu Station Information

Iyotetsu Takahama Line
Railway stations in Ehime Prefecture
Railway stations in Japan opened in 1927
Railway stations in Matsuyama, Ehime